The 11th Engineer Regiment is a military engineer regiment of the Italian Army based in Foggia in Apulia.

The 11th Engineer Regiment was formed in 1928. During World War II the regiment formed engineer battalions and smaller units for deploying divisions. The regiment was disbanded by invading German forces after the announcement of the Armistice of Cassibile on 8 September 1943. In 1958 the Engineer Battalion "Ariete" was formed and assigned to the Armored Division "Ariete". In 1975 the battalion was named for the Livenza river and received the number 132nd, which had been used by the 132nd Engineer Company that served with the 132nd Armored Division "Ariete" during the Western Desert Campaign of World War II. With the name and number the battalion was also assigned the flag and traditions of the 11th Engineer Regiment. In 1986 the Armored Division "Ariete" was disbanded and the battalion was assigned to the 5th Army Corps. In 1993 the battalion lost its autonomy and entered the newly formed 11th Pioneer Regiment. Since 2001 the regiment is the engineer unit of the Mechanized Brigade "Pinerolo".

History

World War II

11th Engineer Regiment 
On 1 March 1928 the 11th Engineer Regiment was formed in Treviso with companies and personnel from the 2nd Engineer Regiment, 4th Engineer Regiment, 5th Engineer Regiment, 6th Engineer Regiment, 7th Engineer Regiment, and 10th Engineer Regiment. The regiment consisted of a sappers-miners battalion, a telegraphers battalion, a cableway battalion, and three dovecotes. On 1 February 1931 the Cableway Battalion was reorganized as Miners-Cableway Battalion. In 1932 the regiment moved to Udine. On 28 October 1932 the Miners-Cableway Battalion was transferred to the newly formed 2nd Miners Regiment in Verona. On the same day the regiment received the V Battalion of the disbanded 2nd Radio-Telegraphers Regiment.

For the Second Italo-Ethiopian War the regiment mobilized the two photo-electrician sections and one radio-telegraphers section. It also provided 35 Officers and 1,245 enlisted to fill out deployed units. In 1935 the regiment formed a Mixed Engineer Company for alpine division. At the end of 1936 the regiment consisted of a command, an engineer battalion, a radio-telegraphers battalion, mixed engineer company for alpine division, an engineer company for cavalry division, a depot, and three dovecotes. In January 1937 the telegraphers and radio-telegraphers battalions were renamed connections battalions.

With the outbreak of World War II the regiment's depot began to mobilize new units:

 III Mixed Engineer Battalion (for the 3rd Alpine Division "Julia")
 VII Engineer Battalion 
 XII Engineer Battalion 
 XVII Mixed Engineer Battalion (for the Armored Army Corps)

The regiment was disbanded by invading German forces after the announcement of the Armistice of Cassibile on 8 September 1943.

132nd Engineer Company 
In February 1939 the 4th Engineer Regiment formed the 132nd Mixed Engineer Company for the 132nd Armored Division "Ariete". The division was deployed to Libya to fight in the Western Desert Campaign. On 11 August 1941 132nd Mixed Engineer Company was split to form the 132nd Engineer Company and the 232nd Connections Company, which both entered the newly formed XXXII Mixed Engineer Battalion. In November 1942 the division and battalion were destroyed in the Second Battle of El Alamein and declared lost due to wartime events on 8 December 1942.

Cold War 
On 25 July 1952 an Engineer Company was raised for the Armored Brigade "Ariete". On 1 July 1958 the company entered the newly formed Engineer Battalion "Ariete" in Motta di Livenza. The battalion was assigned to the Armored Division "Ariete" and consisted of a command, a command and park company, and two engineer companies.

During the 1975 army reform the army disbanded the regimental level and newly independent battalions were granted for the first time their own flags. During the reform engineer battalions were named for a lake if they supported a corps or named for a river if they supported a division or brigade. On 1 November 1975 the Engineer Battalion "Ariete" was renamed 132nd Engineer Battalion "Livenza" and assigned the flag and traditions of the 11th Engineer Regiment. The battalion also received all the traditions of the engineer units that served with the Ariete division. The battalion was assigned to the Armored Division "Ariete" and consisted of a command, a command and park company, and two engineer companies.

In 1986 the Italian Army disbanded the divisional level and placed brigades under direct command of its Army Corps and with the Ariete scheduled to disband on 1 October 1986 the battalion was renamed 132nd Sappers Battalion "Livenza" and transferred on 1 August 1986 to the 5th Army Corps's Engineer Command. The same year the battalion added a third engineer company. On 31 August 1987 the Command and Park Company split into the Command and Services Company, and the Special Equipment Company.

On 1 April 1991 the battalion was renamed 132nd Engineer Battalion "Livenza". On 23 June 1993 the battalion lost its autonomy and the next day the battalion entered the newly formed 11th Pioneer Regiment. On the same date the flag and traditions of the 11th Engineer Regiment were transferred from the battalion to the 11th Pioneer Regiment. In 2001 the regiment was renamed 11th Engineer Regiment and moved from Motta di Livenza to Foggia in the South of Italy, where it was assigned to the Mechanized Brigade "Pinerolo".

Current structure 

As of 2023 the 11th Engineer Regiment consists of:

  Regimental Command, in Foggia
 Command and Logistic Support Company
 Sappers Battalion "Livenza"
 1st Sappers Company
 2nd Sappers Company
 3rd Sappers Company
 4th Deployment Support Company

The Command and Logistic Support Company fields the following platoons: C3 Platoon, Transport and Materiel Platoon, Medical Platoon, Commissariat Platoon, and EOD Platoon. Each of the two sapper companies fields a Command Platoon, an Advanced Combat Reconnaissance Teams Platoon, and two sapper platoons. The Deployment Support Company and Mobility Support Company field the battalion's heavy military engineering vehicles: Biber bridgelayers, Dachs armored engineer vehicles, cranes, excavators, Medium Girder Bridges etc. The sapper companies and Command and Logistic Support Company are equipped with VTLM "Lince" and VTMM "Orso" vehicles.

See also 
 Mechanized Brigade "Pinerolo"

External links
Italian Army Website: 11° Reggimento Genio Guastatori

References

Engineer Regiments of Italy